Vũ Văn Ninh (born 23 February 1955 in Nam Định Province) is a Vietnamese politician and was previously one of four Deputy Prime Ministers of Vietnam headed by former Prime Minister Nguyễn Tấn Dũng.

Early life

Vũ Văn Ninh was born on February 23, 1955, in Nam Định Province. After graduating from the University of Finance and Accounting (now the Financial Academy), from November 1977 to August 1982, he was assigned to the Ministry of Finance as a professional officer, In turn, the Department of Foreign Exchange and Foreign Trade Management (now the Department of Debt Management and External Finance), Department of Financial Balance (now the Department of Finance of Banks and Financial Institutions) the local budget management and then the State Budget Department.
In August 1982, he was promoted to Deputy Manager, working at the Department of Local Budget Management, Ministry of Finance. From November 1986, transferred to the Department of State Budget Management, Ministry of Finance. In May 1987, he was the Deputy Secretary General of the Ministry of Finance. He was admitted to the Communist Party of Vietnam on 27 January 1987, officially on 27 January 1988. He was the minister of finance from 2006 to 2011.

References

Deputy Prime Ministers of Vietnam
Finance ministers of Vietnam
Government ministers of Vietnam
1955 births
Living people
Members of the 10th Central Committee of the Communist Party of Vietnam
Members of the 11th Central Committee of the Communist Party of Vietnam